Eunota, also known as the saline tiger beetles, is a genus of beetles in the family Cicindelidae first described by Émile Rivalier in 1954.

Species 
Eunota contains the following eleven species:
 Eunota californica (Ménétriés, 1843) – California Tiger Beetle
 Eunota circumpicta (LaFerté-Sénectère, 1841) – Cream-edged Tiger Beetle
 Eunota fulgoris (Casey, 1913) – Glittering Tiger Beetle
 Eunota gabbi (G. Horn, 1866) – Western Tidal Flat Tiger Beetle
 Eunota mecocheila Duran & Roman, 2021
 Eunota pamphila (LeConte, 1873) – Gulfshore Tiger Beetle
 Eunota praetextata (LeConte, 1854) – Riparian Tiger Beetle
 Eunota rockefelleri (Cazier, 1954)
 Eunota severa (LaFerté-Sénectère, 1841) – Saltmarsh Tiger Beetle
 Eunota striga (LeConte, 1875) – Elusive Tiger Beetle
 Eunota togata (LaFerté-Sénectère, 1841) – White-cloaked Tiger Beetle

References

Cicindelidae